Headline Chasers is a syndicated game show that ran daily from September 9, 1985 to May 23, 1986, with reruns airing until September 5. The series was hosted by Wink Martindale, who also created the series and was its executive producer, with Johnny Gilbert serving as announcer. The show was a co-production of Wink Martindale Enterprises and Merv Griffin Enterprises with King World Productions, Griffin's partner for his other syndicated game show offerings, as distributor. Headline Chasers was recorded at TAV Celebrity Theater in Hollywood, the same studio which housed The Merv Griffin Show (which, at the time Headline Chasers premiered, was still in production).

This show pitted two couples against each other solving Hangman-style word puzzles designed to look like newspaper headlines, as well as answering questions about the subjects of these puzzles, in an attempt to win money.

Conception
Wink Martindale claimed he came up with the idea for the show while reading the Los Angeles Times, although the game was nearly identical to the Canadian game show Headline Hunters hosted by Jim Perry, which had first aired in 1972.  He then created a pilot titled Front Page, which he submitted to Merv Griffin Enterprises. As Martindale was both host and producer of Headline Chasers, he stepped down from his role as host of Tic-Tac-Dough in 1985, where Jim Caldwell succeeded him.

Game play

Main game

Headline Chasers was played in three rounds, referred to on-air as "editions" by Martindale in keeping with the newspaper theme of the program. Married couples competed against each other.

In the first edition, a newspaper headline with various letters missing (referred to as an "altered headline") was presented to both couples, as well as the date on which the described event was reported. The value of each headline began at $500 and decreased by $100 for each clue provided. As a clue was presented, additional letters were placed into the headline. The first couple to buzz-in and correctly solve the headline received the money, and Martindale then asked two toss-up questions based upon the headline for $100 each. Three altered headlines were played in the first round. After several weeks of shows, a voice (mostly Gilbert's) would tell the home viewers how many words were in each headline.

During the second edition, the couples attempted to identify the subjects of magazine covers and video clips, which were purposely distorted in some way. For the magazine covers, an actual cover was used and the subject's face and anything referring to their identity was blacked out. A maximum of four clues would be shown on screen as in the first edition. For the video questions, the clips would be scrambled to start and would slowly come into focus while the audio could be heard without distortion. No on-screen clues were given, but Martindale read a brief clue before the clip began. The value of each puzzle began at $500 and decreased by $100 for each revealed clue (magazine covers) or for every few seconds that no one buzzed-in (video clips). If a couple buzzed-in and could not identify the subject, the value was frozen and the opponents received any remaining clues or could see the entire clip before making their guess. Two magazine covers and two video clips were played during this round.

The final edition featured altered headlines similar to round one, but the value of each headline began at $1,000 and decreased with successive clues in a different sequence ($1,000-$800-$600-$200-$100). Four altered headlines were played during the round. Two $200 toss-ups were played after each of the first three, while the fourth was followed by a single question for which each couple had to wager a portion of their score. The couple with the higher wager got the first chance at the question; a correct answer added the wager to their score, while a miss deducted it. In the latter case, the opposing couple was given the option to either answer for their own wager or pass.

The couple in the lead following the final question won the game and moved on to the bonus round, and both teams kept their winnings. In the event of a tie, one last altered headline was played and the first couple to solve it won the game.

Headline Extra
The winning couple played a bonus round called Headline Extra for up to $5,000. The couple chose one of five categories, and an altered headline fitting it was revealed. After studying the headline for five seconds, they could either try to solve it or ask for up to four clues. Unlike in the main game, no further letters were revealed in the headline as each clue was given. The couple had a further seven seconds to study the headline as one clue was shown at a time.

The couple won $5,000 for solving the headline immediately, and each requested clue reduced the prize by $1,000. An incorrect guess ended the round with no further winnings.

A couple could win up to $23,600 in a single game, by solving every headline/cover/video clip for its maximum value, answering every toss-up correctly, wagering their entire total on the last question of the final edition and answering correctly, and solving the Headline Extra puzzle with no clues.

References

First-run syndicated television programs in the United States
1980s American game shows
1985 American television series debuts
1986 American television series endings
Television series by Merv Griffin Enterprises
Television series by Sony Pictures Television
Television series by King World Productions
Television series about journalism
Television shows set in Los Angeles